Kirkcowan is an area about 15 miles in length, and from nearly two to nearly seven miles in breadth, comprising 30,580 acres, of which 7000 are arable, 300 woodland and plantations, and the remainder meadow, pasture in Machars, in the historical county of Wigtownshire, in Dumfries and Galloway, Scotland, with the village of Kirkcowan, bounded on the east by the river Bladnoch, on the west by the river Tarff, and is 6 miles W. by S.W. from Newton Stewart.

Kirkcowan with its wide moorlands is one of the larger Wigtownshire areas, and a map of the area/parish can be seen at the National Library of Scotland, on the John Ainslie map AD1782.

The principal industry has always been agriculture, although in the 19th century two woollen mills were erected on the River Tarff nearby.

The A75 road which goes through Kirkcowan is effectively the London - Belfast road. The road forms part of the international E-road, European route E18.

There is a Community Council at Kirkcowan.

Kirkcowan is on the medieval pilgrim route to Whithorn Priory, seat of Christianity in Scotland.

Location 
The village of Kirkcowan is on the road to Wigtown, and situated between the rivers Tarff and Bladnoch.

Because the village is situated on the main Stranraer to Carlisle bus route, and between the two rivers, it attracts fishermen, hikers and also cyclists since it is on the Machars Yellow cycle route.

The church, erected in 1829, under the patronage of the Agnew family, is a substantial structure with a tower. A congregation of Seceders assembled for public worship in an old barn.

Kirkcowan Village has a Post Office; Nursery and Primary School; a village hall,  a service station, mechanical garage, pub/hotel (Craighlaw Arms) and a photography studio.

Places of interest
Glendarroch Loch, situated in the vicinity of the village of Kirkcowan and easily accessible from the A75 Euroroute, is one of the region's coarse fishing gems. The loch is a small, gin clear estate loch which holds a large head of roach, rudd and perch. Carp have been stocked in recent years and are regularly caught whilst tench and bream up to 3lb are also present.

Loch Maberry Castle Crannog. A fortified island surrounded by the remains of a massive drystone wall, 1.8m to 2.1m thick and about 2.1m high, enclosing an area approx 34.1m by 25.9m which has been subdivided and contains buildings all except the largest being of dry-stone. Entrances on east and west and the island has been connected by causeway to both the loch shore and the island to the north, which shows evidence of having been surrounded at the water's edge by a low wall of large boulders occasionally set on end. A causeway from the south-western end of this island links with that between the southern island and the shore.

The River Bladnoch rises at Loch Maberry in the parish of Kirkcowan, through which it runs south to Polbae.

On its journey south it is joined by Reoch Burn as it passes through Carseriggan Moor.

Continuing its journey it passes Isle-na-Gower and becomes a border between the afforested land at Hopeless Howe and the Ring of Barfad.

Shortly after this it is met and joined by Black Burn. At this point the river is bordered on its east side by Barnley Plantation.

Crossing the River Bladnoch at the stepping stones is a single-track road which links Mark of Shennanton with Little Eldrig.

Shortly after this point the river widens briefly at Broad Wheel. Continuing on its journey southwards it is next forded by Shennanton Bridge where the A75 crosses it.

Next we come to Linn Wood and the waterfall at Linn of Barhoise. The word "linn" refers to the pool rather than the waterfall.  (see photo)

The river then moves on past Barhoise Farm to Barhoise Mill.

In 1684, according to Symson, this area had a salmon fishery with nets on both the Bladnoch and the Tarff.

At the Mill of Barhoise, the Laird of Craichlaw had fishing rights. Barhoise Mill is a T-shaped two storey construction of granite, whinstone and slate, which is falling into a dilapidated state. The mill was driven by a wheel which was situated at the side of the building. Of this wheel only the wooden axle remains. The datestone above the door reads 1827, but this mill is most certainly a reconstruction of a much earlier one, perhaps connected with the Old Place of Glaisnick, a one-time nearby residence of the powerful Gordon family of Craichlaw.  The main road from Kirkcowan to Wigtown and from Kirkcowan to Minnigaff via Glaisnick crossed the river just south of this mill. There are still stepping stones at the fording place east of Ring Farm.

Eldrig Fell, Wood Cairn. a large circular cairn 18m. in diameter and 2.2m. high.

Near Shennanton there is a cairn marked on OS mapping, shown in the centre of the photo in front of the tall trees (see photo).

Boreland Mote or Motte is on OS mapping and sits at the side of the B733.  It is about 20 feet high and 100-120feet around the base (see photo).

Mindork or Mondork Castle, Wood Hill.  Thomas M'Dowall was born c.1500 at Mondork Castle. map  c.1782 map

Woodhill (Cairn opposite side of road to Mindork Castle ?) archaeological site.

History
William Gordon, had charters of parts of the barony of Craichlaw, in the parish of Kirkcowan and county of Wigtown, 17 September 1500 and 28 January 1506–7; one of the lands of Larglegastell and Markleif, 10 January 1515–16; and another of the lands of Auchingilbert, 4 August 1515. He married Janet Baillie, and was ancestor of the Gordons of Craighlaw.

The railway station of the Portpatrick and Wigtownshire Joint Railway closed in 1965.

A mill was erected in 1822 for the manufacture of woollen cloths,  blankets, plaidings, flannels, and plain and pilot cloths, for the dyeing and dressing of which the soft water of the Tarff was well adapted.

Notable people
Thomas Hugh Milroy FRSE born here in 1869

Listed Buildings
List of listed buildings in Kirkcowan, Dumfries and Galloway

Gallery (click on photos)

References

Villages in Dumfries and Galloway
Parishes in Dumfries and Galloway